Olearia nernstii is a species of flowering plant in the family Asteraceae and is endemic to eastern Australia. It is a shrub with scattered egg-shaped to elliptic leaves with toothed or prickly edges, and white and yellow, daisy-like inflorescences.

Description
The lower surface of the leaves is covered with woolly brown hairs. Flowering occurs from July to November and the fruit is a more or less glabrous achene, the pappus with 29 to 45 bristles.

Taxonomy
This daisy bush was first formally described in 1865 by Ferdinand von Mueller, who gave it the name Aster nernstii in Fragmenta Phytographiae Australiae from specimens he collected near Moreton Bay. In 1867, George Bentham changed the name to Olearia nernstii in Flora Australiensis.

In the Fragmenta, Mueller refers to a collection made by Nerst near Ipswich. The Public Place Names Act 1989 of the Australian Capital Territory, refers to Nernst Place named after "Joseph Nernst c. 1832–1878) botanical collector".

Distribution and habitat
Olearia nernstii grows in forest or woodland in coastal areas and nearby ranges of south-eastern Queensland to near Gosford and as far inland as Torrington in New South Wales.

References

Asterales of Australia
Flora of New South Wales
Flora of Queensland
nernstii
Plants described in 1865
Taxa named by Ferdinand von Mueller